Anenii Noi is a city in east-central Moldova, the seat of Anenii Noi District. It is located  SE of the capital, Chișinău.

According to the 2004 census, the city administers an area inhabited by 11,463 people. This area consists of the city itself, population 8,358, and five suburb villages: Albiniţa, population 370, Beriozchi, population 647, Hîrbovăţul Nou, population 484, Ruseni, population 1,090, and Socoleni, population 514. Of the 10,872 recorded in the 2014 census, 6,756 are Moldovans, 1,894 Ukrainians, 1,427 Russians, 294 Romanians, 81 Gagauzians, 200 Bulgarians, and 33 Roma. At the 1930 census, there were two localities: Anenii Noi, population 661 (558 Bessarabian Germans, 30 Russians, 19 Romanians, and 4 Poles), and Anenii Vechi, population 990 (891 Russians, 74 Romanians, 19 Germans, 4 Jews, and 2 Bulgarians) in Plasa Bulboaca of Tighina County.

There are two restaurants and a few factories in Anenii Noi. Transportation is available to Anenii Noi every half-hour from Chișinău.

International relations

Twin towns – Sister cities
Anenii Noi is twinned with:
  Korosten, Ukraine  
  Babruysk, Belarus

References

Gallery

External links

 Anenii Noi Official web-site
 Anenii Noi Consiliul web-site
 Anenii Noi Unofficial web-site

Cities and towns in Moldova
Tighina County (Romania)
Ținutul Nistru
Anenii Noi District
Moldova articles needing attention